George David Birkhoff (March 21, 1884 – November 12, 1944) was an American mathematician best known for what is now called the ergodic theorem. Birkhoff was one of the most important leaders in American mathematics in his generation, and during his time he was considered by many to be the preeminent American mathematician.

The George D. Birkhoff House, his residence in Cambridge, Massachusetts, has been designated a National Historic Landmark.

Personal life
He was born in Overisel Township, Michigan, the son of David Birkhoff and Jane Gertrude Droppers.   The mathematician Garrett Birkhoff (1911–1996) was his son.

Career
Birkhoff obtained his A.B. and A.M. from Harvard University. He completed his Ph.D. in 1907, on differential equations, at the University of Chicago. While E. H. Moore was his supervisor, he was most influenced by the writings of Henri Poincaré. After teaching at the University of Wisconsin–Madison and Princeton University, he taught at Harvard from 1912 until his death.

Awards and honors
In 1923, he was awarded the inaugural Bôcher Memorial Prize by the American Mathematical Society for his paper in 1917 containing, among other things, what is now called the Birkhoff curve shortening process.

He was elected to the National Academy of Sciences, the American Philosophical Society, the American Academy of Arts and Sciences, the Académie des Sciences in Paris, the Pontifical Academy of Sciences, and the London and Edinburgh Mathematical Societies.

The George David Birkhoff Prize in applied mathematics is awarded jointly by the American Mathematical Society and the Society for Industrial and Applied Mathematics in his honor.

Service
Vice-president of the American Mathematical Society, 1919.
President of the American Mathematical Society, 1925–1926.
Editor of Transactions of the American Mathematical Society, 1920–1924.

Work
In 1912, attempting to solve the four color problem, Birkhoff introduced the chromatic polynomial. Even though this line of attack did not prove fruitful, the polynomial itself became an important object of study in algebraic graph theory.

In 1913, he proved Poincaré's "Last Geometric Theorem," a special case of the three-body problem, a result that made him world-famous. In 1927, he published his Dynamical Systems. He wrote on the foundations of relativity and quantum mechanics, publishing (with R. E. Langer) the monograph Relativity and Modern Physics in 1923. In 1923, Birkhoff also proved that the Schwarzschild geometry is the unique spherically symmetric solution of the Einstein field equations. A consequence is that black holes are not merely a mathematical curiosity, but could result from any spherical star having sufficient mass.

Birkhoff's most durable result has been his 1931 discovery of what is now called the ergodic theorem. Combining insights from physics on the ergodic hypothesis with measure theory, this theorem solved, at least in principle, a fundamental problem of statistical mechanics. The ergodic theorem has also had repercussions for dynamics, probability theory, group theory, and functional analysis. He also worked on number theory, the Riemann–Hilbert problem, and the four colour problem. He proposed an axiomatization of Euclidean geometry different from Hilbert's (see Birkhoff's axioms); this work culminated in his text Basic Geometry (1941).

His 1933 Aesthetic Measure proposed a mathematical theory of aesthetics. While writing this book, he spent a year studying the art, music and poetry of various cultures around the world. His 1938 Electricity as a Fluid combined his ideas on philosophy and science. His 1943 theory of gravitation is also puzzling since Birkhoff knew (but didn't seem to mind) that his theory allows as sources only matter which is a perfect fluid in which the speed of sound must equal the speed of light.

Influence on hiring practices
Albert Einstein and Norbert Wiener, among others, accused Birkhoff of advocating anti-Semitic hiring practices. During the 1930s, when many Jewish mathematicians fled Europe and tried to obtain jobs in the USA, Birkhoff is alleged to have influenced the hiring process at American institutions to exclude Jews. Birkhoff's anti-Semitic views and remarks are well-documented, but Saunders Mac Lane has argued that Birkhoff's efforts were motivated less by animus towards Jews than by a desire to find jobs for home-grown American mathematicians.

However, Birkhoff took a particular liking to certain Jewish mathematicians, including Stanislaw Ulam. Gian-Carlo Rota writes: "Like other persons rumored to be anti-Semitic, he would occasionally feel the urge to shower his protective instincts on some good-looking young Jew. Ulam's sparkling manners were diametrically opposite to Birkhoff's hard-working, aggressive, touchy personality. Birkhoff tried to keep Ulam at Harvard, but his colleagues balked at the idea."

Selected publications

Birkhoff, George David and Ralph Beatley. 1959. Basic Geometry, 3rd ed. Chelsea Publishing Co. [Reprint: American Mathematical Society, 2000. ]

See also

Birkhoff factorization
Birkhoff–Grothendieck theorem
Birkhoff's theorem
Birkhoff's axioms
Birkhoff interpolation
Birkhoff–Kellogg invariant-direction theorem
Poincaré–Birkhoff theorem
Equidistribution theorem
Chromatic polynomial
Recurrent point
Topological dynamics

Notes

References
Aubin, David, 2005, "Dynamical systems" in Grattan-Guinness, I., ed., Landmark Writings in Western Mathematics. Elsevier: 871–81.

Kip Thorne, 19nn. Black Holes and Time Warps. W. W. Norton. .

Norbert Wiener, 1956. I am a Mathematician. MIT Press. Especially pp. 27–28.
George D. Birkhoff, Proc Natl Acad Sci U S A. 1943 August; 29(8): 231–239, "Matter, Electricity and Gravitation in Flat Space-Time".

Further reading

External links

Birkhoff's biography − from National Academies Press, by Oswald Veblen.
National Academy of Sciences Biographical Memoir

1884 births
1944 deaths
20th-century American mathematicians
Harvard University alumni
University of Chicago alumni
University of Wisconsin–Madison faculty
Princeton University faculty
Harvard University faculty
Topologists
American relativity theorists
Presidents of the American Mathematical Society
Members of the United States National Academy of Sciences
Members of the Pontifical Academy of Sciences
Mathematicians from Michigan
Fellows of the Royal Society of Edinburgh
Members of the Göttingen Academy of Sciences and Humanities